Wayman P. Britt (born August 31, 1954) is a retired American basketball player.

Born in Wilson's Mills, North Carolina, he played collegiately for the University of Michigan, where he received a Bachelor of Arts in communication. The university's annual award for the "Outstanding Defensive Player" is named for Britt.

Britt was selected by the Los Angeles Lakers in the fourth round (60th pick overall) of the 1976 NBA Draft.

He played for the Detroit Pistons (1977–78) in the NBA for 7 games.

Britt also was drafted in the 13th round (364th overall) of the 1976 NFL Draft by the Washington Redskins.

Following his NBA career, Britt held various management positions at Steelcase and Michigan National Bank – Central, before joining the government of Kent County, Michigan, Michigan's 4th largest county, as Deputy County Administrator.

In 2018, Britt was named Kent County Administrator, overseeing the daily activities of the county and serving as the county's Chief Administrative and Financial Officer.

References

External links

1952 births
Living people
Basketball players from North Carolina
Detroit Pistons players
Guards (basketball)
Los Angeles Lakers draft picks
Michigan Wolverines men's basketball players
People from Johnston County, North Carolina
American men's basketball players